Oai may refer to:
 Oai (Attica), a deme of ancient Attica
 Saigō-no-Tsubone (1552–1589), a figure in the history of feudal Japan whose common nickname was Oai

See also
OAI (disambiguation)